The Kadaru are a sub-ethnic group of the Nuba peoples in the Nuba Mountains of South Kordofan state, in southern Sudan.  They live in the Kadaru Hills between Dilling and Delami in South Kurdufan.

Most of its members are Muslims. The number of persons in this group is above 10,000.

They speak Kadaru language, a language of the Nubian branch of the Nilo-Saharan family.

See also
Index: Nuba peoples

References
Joshua Project

Nuba peoples
Ethnic groups in Sudan